Ardisia websteri is a species of plant in the family Primulaceae. It is endemic to Ecuador.

References

websteri
Endemic flora of Ecuador
Vulnerable flora of South America
Taxonomy articles created by Polbot